The United Arab Emirates Anti-Discrimination Law was enacted in the United Arab Emirates on July 20, 2015, when it was signed by President Sheikh Khalifa. Under this law, any form of discrimination against people and religion is outlawed. Penalties include jail terms ranging from six months to over 10 years and/or fines ranging in amounts from DH 50,000 to DH 2,000,000.

Provisions 

The law governs oral and written communications such as books, pamphlets, online media such as blogs, social media posts, website articles and online comments. The law outlaws acts of hate and labelling other religious groups or individuals as atheist or unbelievers. The law is intended to strengthen the UAE as a progressive and equal rights society.

The law criminalizes acts that are considered to be insulting to a deity of a particular religion, prophets, apostles, holy books, houses of worship, or graveyards. Provisions include an anti-discrimination advocate for disputes based on religion, caste, doctrine, race, color or ethnic origin.

The law deplores violence such as hate speech and promotion of discrimination on all media platforms. Any expression of hate against people and religion in spoken and published media is outlawed.

See also 

Censorship in Islamic societies
Government of the United Arab Emirates

References 

 Anti-discrimination law enacted across UAE
 UAE law makes hatred a crime
 Latest UAE law: DH20 Million Fine for Discrimination

Anti-discrimination law
Law of the United Arab Emirates
Discrimination in the United Arab Emirates
2015 in law
2015 in the United Arab Emirates